Xuemin Lin from the University of New South Wales, Sydney, NSW, Australia was named Fellow of the Institute of Electrical and Electronics Engineers (IEEE) in 2016 for contributions to algorithmic paradigms for database technology.

References 

Fellow Members of the IEEE
Living people
Academic staff of the University of New South Wales
Australian computer scientists
University of Queensland alumni
Fudan University alumni
Year of birth missing (living people)